Leopold Bettelheim (23 February 1777, Galgócz – 9 April 1838) was a Hungarian physician.

He was not only eminent in his profession, but was considered a Hebraist of some importance. He lived in Galgócz (today Hlohovec, Slovakia) next to the river Vág and there held the responsible office of physician-in-ordinary to Count Joseph Erdödy, the influential court chancellor of Hungary, in whose private residence are still preserved the surgical instruments used by Bettelheim in saving the lives of the count and his family, together with documents recording some remarkable cures effected by him.

In 1830 Bettelheim was the recipient of a gold medal of honor from the emperor Francis I for distinguished services to the royal family and to the nobility.

References 

18th-century Hungarian people
Hungarian Jews
19th-century Hungarian physicians
People from Hlohovec
1777 births
1838 deaths
Court physicians